The Ewaninga Conservation Reserve is a protected area in the Northern Territory of Australia consisting of an area of low sand dunes, rocky outcrops and a claypan about   south of Alice Springs. It is significant because of a large number of Aboriginal rock carvings.

Description and history

The conservation reserve was gazetted on 20 November 1996.  The claypan is a slightly concave surface approximately 100m across. It retains water after even light rain, thus attracting many birds and animals. The claypan and surrounding outcrops are also a significant archaeological site.

The conservation reserve contains many prehistoric abraded and pecked engravings that provide an outstanding example of central Australian rock art.

The main feature of the area is a set of about 1000 petroglyphs, distributed among the rock outcrops to the south and south-east of the claypan. Most of the petroglyphs are non-representational, consisting of circles, lines and other geometric motifs, though there are some examples of animal tracks. The motifs have been compared with those found elsewhere in Central Australia and Tasmania.

Aspects of the petroglyphs such as their motifs and degree of weathering suggest an age as great as 30000 years, although a more precise age is unknown. Flood describes the petroglyphs as Panaramitee-style, which, based on dating of other Paranamitee sites, could give a date as early as 40000 years ago.

An Indigenous land use agreement was signed by the Central Land Council and the Northern Territory Government on 30 November 2005 for the purpose of granting the conservation reserve as Aboriginal land under the Aboriginal Land Rights Act 1976.

The conservation reserve is considered a significant link to the activities of the early Arrernte people of the region. Permission to access the site has been granted by the Arrente custodians.

In December 2004, laser-scanned 3D images of the petroglyphs were included in the exhibition "Extremes – Survival in the Great Deserts of the Southern Hemisphere" by the National Museum of Australia.

See also
 Chambers Pillar
 Henbury Meteorites Conservation Reserve
 Rainbow Valley Conservation Reserve
 Uluṟu-Kata Tjuṯa National Park
 Watarrka National Park
 West MacDonnell National Park
 N'Dhala Gorge Nature Park

References

 

Rock art in Australia
Conservation reserves in the Northern Territory
1970 establishments in Australia
Protected areas established in 1970